The 2002 LSU Tigers football team represented Louisiana State University in the 2002 NCAA Division I-A football season.  Coached by Nick Saban, the Tigers played their home games at Tiger Stadium in Baton Rouge, Louisiana.  The defending SEC champion Tigers started out strong, but an injury to starting quarterback Matt Mauck hurt the team and they lost four of their final six games.  The season is memorable because of the famous Bluegrass Miracle against the Kentucky Wildcats.

Schedule

Roster and Coaches

LSU Tigers in the 2003 National Football League Draft

https://www.pro-football-reference.com/draft/2003.htm

References

LSU
LSU Tigers football seasons
LSU Tigers football